The canton of Ferney-Voltaire is a former administrative division in eastern France. It was disbanded following the French canton reorganisation which came into effect in March 2015. It had 40,677 inhabitants (2012).

The canton comprised 8 communes:

Ferney-Voltaire
Ornex
Prévessin-Moëns
Saint-Genis-Pouilly
Sauverny
Sergy
Thoiry
Versonnex

Demographics

See also
Cantons of the Ain department 
Communes of France

References

Former cantons of Ain
2015 disestablishments in France
States and territories disestablished in 2015